Busolwe is a town in the Eastern Region of Uganda. It is one of the two municipalities in Butaleja District, the other being Butaleja.

Location

The geographical coordinates of the town are 0°50'57.0"N, 33°55'37.0"E (Latitude:0.849167; Longitude:33.926944).

Population
The 2002 national census recorded the population of Busolwe at 6276. In 2010, the Uganda Bureau of Statistics (UBOS) estimated the town's population at 8,300. In 2011, UBOS estimated the mid-year population at 8,500. In 2014, the national population census put the population at 13,640.

In 2015, UBOS estimated the population of Busolwe at 14,100 people. In 2020, the population agency estimated the mid-year population of the town at 16,800 inhabitants. Of these, 8,700 (51.8 percent) were females and 8,100 (48.2 percent) were males. UBOS calculated the population growth rate of Busolwe Municipality to average 3.56 percent annually between 2015 and 2020.

Points of interest
The following points of interest are found in Busolwe or near its borders:

1. Busolwe General Hospital, a 100-bed public hospital administered by the Uganda Ministry of Health

2. Busolwe Central Market

3. The offices of Busolwe Town Council

4. Busolwe Public Library

5. Lunyole Language Association Headquarters.

See also
 Hospitals in Uganda
 List of cities and towns in Uganda

References

External links
 Butaleja District Information Portal
 Busolwe Public Lirary

Populated places in Eastern Region, Uganda
Cities in the Great Rift Valley
Butaleja District